Theodore Shapiro is a psychiatrist and psychoanalyst in New York, where he is a professor emeritus in psychiatry and pediatrics at Weill Cornell Medical College and the Payne Whitney Psychiatric Clinic. He is a faculty member of the Columbia University Center for Psychoanalytic Training and Research and a training and supervising psychoanalyst at the New York Psychoanalytic Institute.

Shapiro is the former director of the division of child psychiatry at Cornell and the former editor of the Journal of the American Psychoanalytic Association. He graduated from Wesleyan University in 1953 and from the Weill Cornell Medical College in 1957.

In 1994, when Shapiro stepped down after ten years service as editor of the Journal of the American Psychoanalytic Association, he had published nearly 150 research articles and six books. Cooper writes: "His publications include significant contributions to our understanding of empathy, autism, linguistic structure, symbol formation, and diagnosis, among other topics." Since that time he has continued publishing and is the author or editor of at least nine books.

Books
Infant Psychiatry: A New Synthesis (with Eveoleen N. Rexford and Louis W. Sander). Yale University Press, 1976. .
Psychoanalysis and Contemporary Science (edited collection). International Universities Press, 1977. .
Clinical psycholinguistics. Plenum Press, 1979. .
The Concept of Structure in Psychoanalysis. International Universities Press, 1989. .
Affect: Psychoanalytic Perspectives (with Robert N. Emde). International Universities Press, 1992. .
Research in psychoanalysis: process, development, outcome (with Robert N. Emde). International Universities Press, 1995. .
Manual of panic-focused psychodynamic psychotherapy (with Barbara Milrod, Arnold Cooper, and Fredric Busch). American Psychiatric Pub., 1996. .
Psychodynamic treatment of depression (with Fredric Busch and Marie Rudden). American Psychiatric Pub., 2004. .
Psychodynamic Approaches to the Adolescent with Panic Disorder (with Barbara Milrod and Fredric Busch). Krieger Publishing Company, 2004. .

References

American psychiatrists
Wesleyan University alumni
Weill Cornell Medical College alumni
Living people
American psychoanalysts
Year of birth missing (living people)